The 2011 European Short Course Swimming Championships were held in Szczecin, Poland, from December 8 to 11, 2011. The event featured competition in a short course (25m) pool.

The event was held over four days with heats, semifinals and a final for the 50 m and 100 m events and heats and a final for all other events with the exception of the women's 800 m and men's 1500 m freestyle which were heat-declared winners. Heats were held in the morning, with semifinals, finals and the fastest heat of the distance freestyle events in the evening.

Each nation was permitted to enter four swimmers into each individual event, however only the fastest two were allowed to progress to the semifinal and/or final.

Participating nations
543 swimmers (302 males, 241 females) from 39 countries swam at the 2011 Short Course European Championships. Teams (and team size) were from:

 (20)
 (1)
 (13)
 (8)
 (4)
 (12)
 (12)
 (2)
 (19)
 (15)
 (10)
 (2)
 (10)
 (15)
 (23)
 (26)
 (5)
 (22)
 (4)
 (11)
 (13)
 (38)
 (4)
 (1)
 (10)
 (4)
 (24)
 (13)
 (45)
 (5)
 (39)
 (6)
 (11)
 (14)
 (14)
 (10)
 (24)
 (16)
 (19)

Results

Men's events

Legend: WR - World record; WBT - World best time; ER - European record; CR - Championship record; NR - National record

Women's events

Legend: WR - World record; WBT - World best time; ER - European record; CR - Championship record; NR - National record

Medal table

References

External links
Event website: www.ecszczecin2011.eu
Results book

European Short Course Swimming Championships
European Short Course Swimming Championships
2011
Swimming
December 2011 sports events in Europe